James Patrick Bannerman Robertson, Baron Robertson,  (19 August 1845 – 1 February 1909), was a Scottish judge and Conservative politician.

Life
Robertson was born in the manse at Forteviot, the son of Helen Bannerman, daughter of Rev. J. Bannerman of Cargill, Perthshire and Rev. Robert John Robertson, minister of Forteviot, Perthshire.

He was educated at the High School in Edinburgh then studied law at the University of Edinburgh graduating with an MA in 1864. He passed to the Scottish bar in 1867. He was president of the Juridical Society 1869–70. He became a Queen's Counsel in 1885. 

Robertson stood unsuccessfully for parliament at Linlithgowshire in 1880. At the 1885 general election he was elected Conservative Member of Parliament for Buteshire and held the seat until 1891.  He was appointed Solicitor General for Scotland in 1885 and again in 1886 and was appointed Lord Advocate in 1888 and was made a Privy Counsellor in the same year. He carried the Local Government (Scotland) Act 1889.

He was elected a Fellow of the Royal Society of Edinburgh in 1886. His proposers were John McLaren, Lord McLaren, Alexander Forbes Irvine, Peter Guthrie Tait and Sir William Turner. In 1890 the University of Edinburgh awarded him an honorary doctorate (LLD).

Robertson gave up his seat when he was appointed Lord President of the Court of Session in 1891, taking the judicial courtesy title of Lord Robertson. He was appointed a Lord of Appeal in Ordinary on 14 November 1899 and created life peer as Baron Robertson, of Forteviot in the County of Perth. He was Rector of the University of Edinburgh in 1893 and was also Chairman of the Irish University Commission. At this time he lived at 19 Drumsheugh Gardens in Edinburgh's West End.

In 1899, he was a member of the Judicial Committee of the Privy Council. He was a Trustee of the Board of Manufactures in Scotland, from which he resigned in 1899.

In later life he retired to live in Muchalls Castle in Aberdeenshire.

He died on 1 February 1909 at Cap Martin on the south coast of France near Monaco, aged 74. He is buried in Elmstead in Kent.

Family
Robertson married Philadelphia Mary Lucy Fraser, daughter of W. N. Fraser of Tornaveen, Aberdeenshire in 1872. They had one daughter and two sons.

Arms

References

External links
 
 Debretts House of Commons and the Judicial Bench 1886
 

1845 births
1909 deaths
Robertson
Law lords
Lord Advocates
Solicitors General for Scotland
Members of the Parliament of the United Kingdom for Scottish constituencies
Alumni of the University of Edinburgh
Rectors of the University of Edinburgh
Scottish King's Counsel
19th-century King's Counsel
Members of the Faculty of Advocates
Scottish Tory MPs (pre-1912)
UK MPs 1886–1892
UK MPs who were granted peerages
Members of the Judicial Committee of the Privy Council
Lords President of the Court of Session
Lords Justice-General
Members of the Privy Council of the United Kingdom
Life peers created by Queen Victoria